The Adamello Brenta Natural Park is a nature reserve in Trentino, Italy. Established in 1967, it encompasses most of the Adamello-Presanella Alps as well as the Brenta Dolomites; it is the largest natural park in Trentino and along with the adjacent Stelvio National Park, Swiss National Park and Adamello Regional Park, it forms the largest protected area in the Alps, nearly 400,000 hectares.It joined the Global Geoparks Network in 2008, becoming a UNESCO Global Geopark when the designation was ratified in 2015.

The park is home to 1,300 species of plants and flowers as well as numerous animals, including the brown bear; in fact, by the 1990s the last surviving specimens of brown bear in the Italian Alps lived in the Brenta Dolomites, and the population was brought back from near-extinction (two or three specimens) to the current population of over ninety specimens thanks to a reintroduction project funded by the European Union, making the brown bear the symbol of the park. The park's fauna also includes 8,000 chamoises, 3,500 roe deer and 1,300 red deer, as well as alpine ibexes, marmots, and 113 species of birds, including twenty-eight golden eagles. 41 glaciers and 48 lakes are located within its territory, as well as twelve mountain huts, seven visitor centers and over 1,000 kilometers of hiking paths; the highest point of the park is Cima Adamello, 3,558 meters above sea level, whereas the lowest point is 447 meters above sea level.

References

External links 
Official website

Adamello Brenta
1967 establishments in Italy
Adamello Brenta
Global Geoparks Network members